Jiaoqu is a district of Changzhi, Shanxi, China.

References

External links
Official website of Jiaoqu District government

County-level divisions of Shanxi
Changzhi